Mirandaphera arafurensis is a species of sea snail, a marine gastropod mollusk in the family Cancellariidae, the nutmeg snails.

Description

Distribution

References

 Verhecken, A., 1997. Mollusca Gastropoda: Arafura Sea Cancellariidae collected during the Karubar Cruise. Mémoires du Muséum national d'Histoire naturelle 172: 295–323

External links
 Holotype at MNHN, Paris
 Bouchet P. & Petit R.E. (2002). New species of deep-water Cancellariidae (Gastropoda) from the southwestern Pacific. The Nautilus 116(3): 95-104

Cancellariidae
Gastropods described in 1997